The Teeth of the Wind is a 1962 television play broadcast by the Australian Broadcasting Corporation. It was written by John Cameron who had written Outpost (1959) which had screened on American television.

It was shot in Melbourne and set in Africa and concerns local politics.

Plot
In a new African republic, Zambotu, a United Nations force holds the elected president and vice president in protective custody under the responsibility of an Australian officer Frank Andrews, who is leading a United Nations Command.

The officer romances Dr Pearson, makes friends with some people experienced with Africa  (Kurt   Ludescher   and   Mary   Ward), and meets President   Ngimba   (Keith Eden).  Ngimba is English educated and was voted into power by a large majority. The colonists favor the vice president, Kurobe.

Ngimba and Kurobe are held in protective custody following clashes between supporters of both. Andrews hears arguments from his friends, Peter and Mary Vender, experienced in Africa. He also hears from Peter Vender ia mining tycoon opposed to local independence who is a supporter of Kurobe. A doctor, Pearson, makes Andrews realise that the people support Zambotu.

The UN releases Kurobe but Andrews has to keep Nigmba in custody. Andrews grows more sympathetic to Ngimba. Ngimba's supporters march on the presidential palace to release him and Frank Andrews considers ordering his troops to open fire. He decides to lay down his arms and the locals take charge. The weapons are used to kill some women.

Cast
Alan Hopgood as Frank Andrews
Roly Barlee as Kandaro	
Keith Eden as President Ngimba
Joan Harris as Doctor Pearson
Kurt Ludescher as Peter Vender
Mary Ward as Mary Vender

Production
It was one of a series of six Australian plays produced by the ABC in 1962. The others were:
Boy Round the Corner
The House of Mancello
Funnel Web
The Hobby Horse
Jenny

The play was John Cameron's follow up to his successful Outpost. It was based on the experience of Dr Ivan Smith, an Australian who worked as Chief United Nations representative during the Congo Crisis in November 1961. He had been attacked by mobs and had to be rescued.

Cameron said, "the play attempts to explore the problem in human terms rather than the stark black and white  of an ideological or racial clash. It examines the tragedy of people caught up in this conflict, each conscious of his own rights, each resentful of the claimed conflicting rights of others."

Cameron said "the play is essentially about people forced into an environment of crisis rather than the stark blac and white issue of a racial clash. I looked for the sort of tough military situation in which a certain decision cold result in a court martial, but with circumstances that could win sympathy for the officer. The Congo was very much in the news at the time I wrote the play. So The Teeth of the Wind is set "somewhere in Africa" and deals with conflicting interests between two cultures."

Reception
The Bulletin gave the play a harsh review saying "the net   result   was neither   drama nor documentary. It was Blue Hills moved   to   Africa, but with a less accurate   presentation   of   the   pros   and cons   than Gwen Meredith provides   in her   more   intense   moments."

References

External links

Australian television plays
Australian Broadcasting Corporation original programming
English-language television shows
1962 television plays